The Roraiman warbler (Myiothlypis roraimae) is a species of passerine bird in the new world warbler family Parulidae. It is known to associate with Tepui rainforest ecosystems and is found in southern Venezuela, western Guyana, and adjacent areas of northern Brazil. The bird has been periodically granted full species status, although it has also been occasionally considered a subspecies of two-banded warbler (Myiothlypis bivittata). Based on the population's physically disparate distance from the nominate species, vocal differences, and slight differences in plumage, several authorities consider the Roraiman warbler independent. Recent genetic evidence also indicates the birds of northern South America are significantly diverged from the two-banded warbler populations in the Andes.

Description 
The Roraiman warbler has a bright yellow throat and underparts with darker olive colored upperparts. The crown is black with an orange central stripe that may be difficult to see in the field. There is a short dusky eyestripe and broken yellow eyering below a yellow supercilium line fading to olive in the rear.

References

Roraiman warbler
Birds of Venezuela
Birds of the Guianas
Birds of Brazil
Roraiman warbler
Birds of the Tepuis